Hempstead High School can refer to:

Hempstead High School (Iowa) in Dubuque, Iowa
Hempstead High School (Texas) in Hempstead, Texas
Hempstead High School (New York) in Hempstead, New York
Hempstead High (album) an album by rapper, A+. Named for Hempstead High School in Hempstead, NY.
West Hempstead High School in West Hempstead, New York